The Halberstadt C.V was a German single-engined reconnaissance biplane of World War I, built by Halberstädter Flugzeugwerke. Derived from the Halberstadt C.III, with a more powerful supercharged 160 kW (220 hp) Benz Bz.IVü engine, it saw service only in the final months of the war. Cameras were mounted in the observer's cockpit floor.

The aircraft had very good flight characteristics, especially maneuverability and rate of climb, and was among best German World War I aircraft in its class. First aircraft appeared in front in late June 1918.

Operators

 Estonian Air Force - Postwar.

 Luftstreitkrafte

 Latvian Air Force - Postwar.

 Lithuanian Air Force - Postwar, 10 aircraft and 6 unlicensed copies, used from 1919 to late 1920s

 Polish Air Force - 11 aircraft, used during Polish-Soviet War in 1919-1920

 Soviet Air Force - 18 units acquired in 1922.

 Swiss Air Force

  West Ukrainian People's Republic Army

Survivors

A single C.V (S/No. 3471/18) survives at the Musée Royal de l'Armée et d'Histoire Militaire in Brussels, Belgium.

Specifications (C.V)

See also

References

Bibliography
 Gerdessen, Frederik. "Estonian Air Power 1918 – 1945". Air Enthusiast, No. 18, April – July 1982. pp. 61–76. .

External links

 Photos by Knut Erik Hagen (Feb 2003)

Military aircraft of World War I
1910s German military reconnaissance aircraft
C.V
Single-engined tractor aircraft
Biplanes
Aircraft first flown in 1918